Huang Chen-hua was a Chinese politician. She was among the first group of women elected to the Legislative Yuan in 1948.

Biography
The oldest daughter of revolutionary leader Huang Xing, Huang attended university in the United States, earning bachelor's and master's degrees from the Teachers College of Columbia University. Returning to China, she became a university professor and education inspector. She worked at the Ministry of Education as an editor and became a member of the Exam Committee. She also served as an advisor to the Executive Yuan and established her own school, becoming its principal.

In the 1948 elections to the Legislative Yuan Huang ran as a Kuomintang candidate in Hunan Province and was elected to parliament. She relocated to Taiwan during the Chinese Civil War.

References

Year of birth unknown
Chinese expatriates in the United States
Educators from Hunan
Teachers College, Columbia University alumni
20th-century Chinese women politicians
Members of the 1st Legislative Yuan
Members of the 1st Legislative Yuan in Taiwan
Year of death unknown
Chinese women educators
Republic of China politicians from Hunan
Heads of schools in China
20th-century Chinese educators
Kuomintang Members of the Legislative Yuan in Taiwan
Taiwanese people from Hunan
Chinese Civil War refugees